The 51st Filmfare Awards South ceremony honouring the winners and nominees of the best of South Indian cinema in films released 2003, is an event that was held  at the Jawaharlal Nehru Stadium, Chennai, 12 June 2004.The awards were distributed at Chennai.

Main awards
Winners are listed first, highlighted in boldface.

Kannada cinema

Malayalam cinema

Tamil cinema

Telugu cinema

Technical Awards

Special awards

References

General
 51st Annual Manikchand Filmfare Award winners

External links
 
 

Filmfare Awards South
2004 Indian film awards